The 1957 Liège–Bastogne–Liège was the 43rd edition of the Liège–Bastogne–Liège cycle race and was held on 5 May 1957. The race started and finished in Liège. The race was won by two riders, Frans Schoubben and Germain Derycke.

Germain Derycke was first over the line, but because he crossed a closed rail crossing, the second-place rider, Frans Schoubben, was promoted to first as well. Derijcke was not disqualified, because he had won by three minutes advantage; judges felt he had not gained that much time from illegally crossing the railway.

General classification

References

1957
1957 in Belgian sport
1957 Challenge Desgrange-Colombo